The Caraclău is a left tributary of the river Trotuș in Romania. It discharges into the Trotuș near Onești.

References

Rivers of Romania
Rivers of Bacău County